FC Shakhtyor Kyzyl-Kiya is a Kyrgyzstani football club based in Kyzyl-Kiya, Kyrgyzstan that played in the top division in Kyrgyzstan, the Kyrgyzstan League.

History 
1992: Founded as FC Semetey Kyzyl-Kiya.
1997: Renamed FC Semetey-Dinamo Kyzyl-Kiya.
1998: Renamed FC Semetey Kyzyl-Kiya.
2001: Renamed FC Kyzyl-Kiya.
2006: Renamed FC Shakhtyor Kyzyl-Kiya.

Stadium

Achievements 
Kyrgyzstan League:
2nd place: 1994
3nd place: 1995

Kyrgyzstan Cup:
Winner: 1995
Finalist: 1999

External links 
Career stats by KLISF

Football clubs in Kyrgyzstan
1992 establishments in Kyrgyzstan